Religion in Papua New Guinea is predominantly Christian, with traditional animism and ancestor worship often occurring less openly as another layer underneath or more openly side by side with Christianity. The courts, government, and general society uphold a constitutional right to freedom of speech, thought, and beliefs. A secular state, there is no state religion in the country, although the government openly partners with several Christian groups to provide services, and churches participate in local government bodies.

A large majority of Papua New Guineans identify themselves as members of a Christian church (96% in the decennial 2000 census); however, many combine their Christian faith with traditional indigenous practices, known as religious syncretism. Other religions represented in the country include the Baháʼí Faith, Hinduism and Islam.

Christianity

The 2000 census percentages were as follows:
Roman Catholic Church (27.0%)
Evangelical Lutheran Church of Papua New Guinea (19.5%)
United Church in Papua New Guinea (11.5%)
Seventh-day Adventist Church (10.0%)
Pentecostal (8.6%)
Evangelical Alliance (PNG) (5.2%)
Anglican Church of Papua New Guinea (3.2%)
Baptist (0.5%)
Salvation Army (0.2%)
Other Christian (10%)
Jehovah's Witnesses (0.4%)
Church of Christ (0.4%)

Iglesia ni Cristo, a Philippine base Christian church had already set its foot in the country.

In 2010, emerging Christian denominations include the Jehovah's Witnesses and the Members Church of God International.

The Papua New Guinea Council of Churches members are:
Anglican Church of Papua New Guinea
Gutnius Lutheran Church (associated with the Lutheran Church–Missouri Synod)
Union Baptist
Roman Catholic Church
Evangelical Lutheran Church of Papua New Guinea
United Church in Papua New Guinea and the Solomon Islands
Salvation Army

There are also a number of parachurch organizations:
The Summer Institute of Linguistics is a missionary institution drawing its support from conservative evangelical Protestant churches in the United States and to a lesser extent Australia; it translates the Bible into local languages and conducts extensive linguistic research.
Young Women's Christian Association.

Several Christian professional educational institutions have been opened in the country, such as Christian Leaders' Training College, Divine Word University, Pacific Adventist University and Sonoma Adventist College.

Traditional religions

Traditional ethnic religions are often animist and many have elements of ancestor worship, as well as tamam witches.

Religious syncretism is high, with many citizens combining their Christian faith with some traditional indigenous religious practices.

New religious movements

Cargo cults
Some cargo cults—the beliefs in a lost "Golden Age", which would be re-established when the dead ancestors returned—sprang up in Papua New Guinea during the 20th century, including the Taro Cult and the events known as the Vailala Madness in the Gulf of Papua, which, by the late 1920s, was no longer active.

Makasol
The Makasol (or "Wind Nation"), also known as Paliau movement, is neo-traditional Millenarianist counter-cultural religious and social movement in Papua New Guinea. Its base is in the Manus Province, a motherland of its founder, the prophet Paliau Maloat (d. 1991). He had served in the colonial police force, but became an opposition political activist, organized a movement, and had been arrested twice by the colonial authority. Later he also opposed the independent Papua governing elite.

The faith of the movement focuses on a new Holy Trinity—Wing, Wang and Wong. The new counter-cultural project is based on native values: local production for use; indigenous medical practices; new versions of traditional social institutions ("men's houses" and replacing the structure of local level governments).

Similar movements
There are similar indigenist movements to the Makasol. An example is the movement led by the remarkable "prophet" Yali in the Rai Coast District of northern Papua.

Baháʼí Faith

The Baháʼí Faith in Papua New Guinea began after 1916 with a mention by `Abdu'l-Bahá, then head of the religion, that Baháʼís should take the religion there. The first Baháʼís moved (referred to as "Baháʼí pioneering") to Papua New Guinea in 1954. With local converts the first Baháʼí Local Spiritual Assembly was elected in 1958. The first National Spiritual Assembly was then elected in 1969. According to the census of 2000, the number of Baháʼís does not exceed 21,000. But the Association of Religion Data Archives (relying on World Christian Encyclopedia) estimated three times more Baháʼís at 60,000 or 0.9% of the nation in 2005 Either way it is the largest minority religion in Papua New Guinea, albeit a small one. Among its more well known members are the late Margaret Elias and the late Sirus Naraqi.

Margaret Elias was the daughter of the first Papua New Guinean woman on the national assembly, and the country's first woman lawyer (in the 1970s). She attended the 1995 Fourth World Conference on Women and was given an award in 1995 and 2002 for her many years in the public service, particularly in the national government. She went on to support various initiatives for education.

Sirus Naraqi lived and worked in Papua New Guinea from 1977 to 1979 and from 1983 to 1998, doing clinical medical work as well as teaching at the University of Papua New Guinea, where he was given an award in 1999 and had served as a member of the Continental Board of Counsellors in Australasia since 1985.

Islam

Islam in Papua New Guinea counts for more than 5,000 followers, (most of whom are Sunni) mainly as a result of a recent spike in conversions. Despite being a dominant religion in neighbouring Indonesia, adherents of Islam make up a small segment of the population.

Hinduism
According to ARDA, PNG had (1,620) 0.02% Hindus in 2015, up from 911 (0.01%) in 2010.

Religious freedom
The constitution of Papua New Guinea establishes freedom of religion and religious practice, provided that it does not infringe on the rights of others or of the public interest. There is no state religion, although the preamble to the constitution mentions "the Christian principles" the country is founded upon. Parliament sessions and most official government functions open and close with Christian prayer. Since 2016, the government has pursued programs to increase the partnership between churches and the state, including subsidies to churches and the establishment of church councils to assist in local governance.

Religious groups are required to register the government in order to hold property and obtain tax-exempt status. Foreign missionaries are allowed into the country on special work visas with lower fees than other visa categories.

Churches operate roughly half of the educational and medical institutions in the country, and receive government subsidies to provide these services. Public schools provide one hour of non-compulsory religious education per week; in practice, few students opt out of these lessons. Government officials have discussed plans to make religious education compulsory, but as of the end of 2017, these were not implemented.

Religious leaders have stated that religious groups are generally able to practice their religion without interference. However, there have been multiple incidences of Muslim refugees and asylum seekers being the targets of stabbings. Other Muslim residents of Papua New Guinea have not faced such attacks.

In the past, the Papuan government were opposed towards formally recognizing Islam and its institutions. However, the government has reportedly threatened to ban Islam to the present day. There are reports of native Muslims experiencing discrimination and even violence from the Christian majority.

References

Further reading 

 Aerts, Theo (ed.): The Martyrs of Papua New Guinea. 333 Missionary Lives Lost During World War II, University of Papua New Guinea Press, Port Moresby 1994,  -  -  - 
 Aerts, Theo: Traditional Religion in Melanesia, University Press of Papua New Guinea, Port Moresby 1998. 189 pp.
 Aerts, Theo: Christianity in Melanesia, University Press of Papua New Guinea, Port Moresby 1998. 256 pp., 
 Ahrens, Theodor: Christian Syncretism: A Study from the Southern Madang District of P.N.G. Catalyst. 1974; 4(1): 3-40.
 Ahrens, Theodor: Concepts of Power in a Melanesian and Biblical Perspective. Missiology. 1977; 5: 141–173.
 Ahrens, Theodor: Melanesische "Cargo"-Kulte'. In: Münzel, Mark, Editor: Neuguinea: Nutzung und Deutung der Umwelt. Frankfurt am Main: Museum für Völkerkunde; 1987: 143-160, 399-400.
 Ahrens, Theodor: Der neue Mensch im kolonialen Zweilicht. Studien zum religiösen Wandel in Ozeanien. (Hamburger Theologische Studien 5). Lit Verlag: Muenster (Germany) 1993, .
 Ahrens, Theodor: Unterwegs zur verlorenen Heimat. Studien zur Identitätsproblematik in Melanesien, Verlag der Ev.-Luth. Mission: Erlangen 1986. 
  Alt, Josef: The Contribution of Arnold Janssen to the SVD Mission in New Guinea. In: Divine Word Missionaries in Papua New Guinea, 1896–1996. Festschrift. Steyler Verlag, Nettetal 1996, S. 11–40. - also in: Verbum SVD. 37:1-2 (1996), S. 11–40.
 Alt, Josef(ed.): Arnold Janssen SVD, Letters to New Guinea and Australia. (Studia Instituti Missiologici SVD 77) Steyler Verlag, Nettetal 2001, .
  Barker, John (ed.): Christianity in Oceania, Ethnographic Perspectives, Lanham University Press of America 1990. 
 Barker, John: Secondary Conversion and the Anthropology of Christianity in Melanesia, in: Archives de sciences sociales des Religions 157 (janvier-mars 2012), p. 67-87. 
 Bartle, Neville: Death, Witchcraft and the Spirit World in the Highlands of Papua New Guinea. Point No. 29, Melanesian Institute: Goroka, PNG 2005. .
 Böhm, Karl: The life of some island people of New Guinea: a missionary's observations of the Volcanic Islands of Manam, Boesa, Biem, and Ubrub, Introduction by Nancy Lutkehaus, (Collectanea Instituti Anthropos Vol. 29), Dietrich Reimer Verlag: Berlin 1983, 
 Breward, Ian: A History of the Churches in Australasia, (The Oxford History of Christian Churches), Oxford University Press, Oxford 2001, Reprinted 2008, 474 pp., .
 Coleman, Simon: Christianities in Oceania: Historical Genealogies and Anthropological Insularities, in: Archives de sciences sociales des Religions 157 (janvier-mars 2012), p. 12-38. 
 Ernst, Manfred: Changing Christianity in Oceania: A Regional Overview, in: Archives de sciences sociales des Religions 157 (janvier-mars 2012), p. 29-45. 
 Ernst, Manfred: Globalization and the Re-Shaping of Christianity in the Pacific Islands, Pacific Theological College, Suva (Fiji) 2006.
 Ernst, Manfred: Winds of Change: Rapidly Growing Religious Groups in the Pacific Islands, Pacific Conference of Churches: Suva 1994. 
 Lawrence, Peter: Road Belong Cargo. A Study of the Cargo Movement in the Southern Madang District, New Guinea, Melbourne University Press: Melbourne 1964. 
 Flannery,Wendy: All Prophets: Revival Movements in the Catholic and Lutheran Churches in the Highlands. In: Catalyst 10 (1980) 229-257.
 Flannery, Wendy (ed.): Religious Movements in Melanesia, vol I, II III, (Point 2,3,4), Melanesian Institute Goroka, 1983-1984.
 Flannery, Wendy: Symbol and Myth in Melanesian Cultures. In: Missiology 7 (1979) 435-449.
 Garrett, John: Footsteps in the Sea: Christianity in Oceania to World War II, Institute of Pacific Studies: Suva 1992.
 Garrett, John: Where Nets Were Cast: Christianity in Oceania Since World War II, Institute of Pacific Studies , University of the South Pacific in association with the World Council of Churches, Suva and Geneva 1997.
 Gewertz, D. and F. Errington: On PepsiCo and piety in Papua New Guinea modernity, in American Ethnologist 23, p. 476-493.
  Gibbs, Phil: Papua New Guinea, in M. Ernst (ed.), Globalization and the Re-Shaping of Christianity in the Pacific Islands, Suva 2006, p. 81-158.
 Gibbs, Phil: Religion and Politics in Papua New Guinea (1997-2000), (Point 24), Melanesian Institute: Goroka 2001.
 Koch-Schmid, Christin (ed.): Expecting the Day of the Wrath: Versions of the Millennium in Papua New Guinea, National Research Institute: Port Moresby 1999.
 Langmore, Diane: Missionary Lives: Papua, 1874-1914, (Pacific Islands Monograph Series, No. 6), University of Hawaii Press: Honolulu 1989. 
 Laracy, Hugh: Marists and Melanesians. A History of Catholic Missions in the Salomon Islands, Australian National University Press: Canberra 1976, 
  Lawrence, Peter and Mervyn J. Meggitt (eds.): God, Ghosts and Men in Melanesia, Oxford University Press: Melbourne 1965. 
 Loeliger,Carl and Garry Trompf (eds.): New Religious Movements in Melanesia, University of Papua New Guinea Press: Port Moresby 1985.
 MacDonald, Mary N.: Religions of Melanesia: A Bibliographic Survey - By Garry W. Trompf, in: Religious Studies Review 33:2 (2007) 167f.,
 Mantovani, Ennio (ed.): An Introduction to Melanesian Religions, (Point, 6), The Melanesian Institute: Goroka 1984.
 Mantovani, Ennio: Mission: Collision or Dialogical Encounter? A Chronicle of St. Paul's Parish, Yobai, Papua New Guinea, (Studia Instituti Missiologici Societas Verbi Divini Nr. 95), Steyler Verlag: Nettetal (Germany) 2011, 
 Mückler, Hermann: Mission in Ozeanien. Wien 2010: Facultas. 328 pp, 
 Narakobi, Bernard C.: The Melanesian Way, Institute of Papua New Guinea Studies: Port Moresby 1983.
 Pech, Rufus: The Acts of the Apostles in Papua New Guinea and Solomon Islands, in: An Introduction to Ministry in Melanesia, Edited by Brian Schwarz, (point Series No. 7), Melanesian Institute: Goroka 1985, 17-71. 
 Renck, Guenther: Contextualization of Christianity and Christianization of Language. A Case Study from the Highlands of New Guinea, Verlag der Ev-Luth. Mission: Erlangen 1989. 
 Robbins, Joel: Becoming sinners. Christianity and moral torment in a Papua New Guinea society, University of California, Berkeley , Los Angeles 2004.
 Sack, Peter, ed.: German New Guinea: A Bibliography, Canberra ACT: Australian National University Press, 1980, 
 Steffen, Paul B.: Centres of Formation and Evangelizing Ministry. Pastoral Institutes in Oceania and Africa. Studia Missiologici Societatis Verbi Divini 102, Franz Schmitt Verlag: Siegburg, Germany 2014, xx + 245 pp., 
 Steffen, Paul B.: From Church to Mission. Assessment and Perspectives of the Catholic Church in Mainland New Guinea after Its First Hundred Years. In: Steyler Missionswissenschaftliche Institut (ed.), Divine Word Missionaries in Papua New Guinea, 1896–1996, Festschrift. Steyler Verl., Nettetal 1996, 231-258, . - ibidem in: Verbum SVD 37:1-2 (1996) 231-258
  Steffen, Paul B.: LIMBROCK, Eberhard SVD (1859-1931), Missionspionier u. Missionsgründer. In: Biographisch-Bibliographisches Kirchenlexikon. (BBKL) 33 (2012), pp. 774–784.
 Steffen, Paul: Missionsbeginn in Neuguinea. Die Anfänge der Rheinischen, Neuendettelsauer u. Steyler Missionsarbeit in Neuguinea. (Studia Instituti Missiologici S.V.D. - 61) Steyler Verlag, Nettetal 1995, .
 Strelan, John G.: Search for Salvation. Studies in the History and Theology of Cargo Movements, Lutheran Publishing House: Adelaide 1977. 
 Sullivan, Nancy: God's Brideprice: Laisez faire Religion, and the Fear of Being Left Behind in Papua New Guinea, in: Contemporary PNG Studies: DWU Research Journal, 6 (2007), p. 63-91.
 Threlfall, Neville: One Hundred Years in the Islands. The Methodist/United Church in the New Guinea Islands Region 1875-1975, The United Church (New Guinea Islands Region), Toksave na Buk dipatmen: Rabaul 1975, 
 Trompf, Garry W. (ed.): The Gospel is Not Western: Black Theologies from the Southwest Pacific, Orbis Books: New York 1987, 
 Trompf, Garry W.: Melanesian Religion, Cambridge University Press: Cambridge 1991, 
 Wagner, Herwig - Hermann Reiner (eds.): The Lutheran Church in Papua New Guinea. The First Hundred Years 1886-1986, second printing, Lutheran Publishing House: Adelaide (Australia) 1987, 677 pp., 
 Wagner, Herwig - Gernot Fugmann - Hermann Janssen (eds.): Papua Neuguinea. Geschichte und Kirche. Ein ökumenisches Handbuch, Verl. der Ev.Luth. Mission: Erlangen, 1989, 464 pp. + 16 Bildseiten, 
 Waiko, John Dademo: A Short History of Papua New Guinea, Oxford University Press: Melbourne (Australia) 1993, 275 pp., 
 Wesemann, Heiner: Papua Neuguinea. Nuigini. Steinzeit-Kulturen auf dem Weg ins 20. Jahrhundert. Dumont Buchverlag: Köln 1985.
 Wetherell, David: Reluctant Mission: The Anglican Church in Papua New Guinea, University of Queensland Press, St. Lucia 1977. 
 Whitehouse, Harvey: From Mission to Movement: The Impact of Christianity on Patterns of Political Association in Papua New Guinea, in: Journal of the Royal Anthropological Institute 4-1 (1998), p. 43-63.
 Worsley, Peter: The Trumpet Shall Sound: A Study of "Cargo" Cults in Melanesia'', Schocken Books: New York 1968.

External links
Islamic Society of Papua New Guinea
Anglican history in Papua New Guinea - primary texts
 Jebens reports on his comparative anthropolical study of two forms of Christianity, i.e. Roman Catholics and Seventh-day Adventists, in the PNG village of Pairundu.

 
Religion in the British Empire